William Gleason (1868 – December 2, 1893) was a major league baseball pitcher for the 1890 Cleveland Infants. He lost his only game, giving up 12 earned runs in 4 innings. Gleason was born and died in Cleveland, Ohio.

References
Baseball-Reference.com Career Statistics

External links

1868 births
1893 deaths
19th-century baseball players
Baseball players from Cleveland
Cleveland Infants players